A juggernaut is an unstoppable force. This may also refer to:
 Juggernaut (wrestler) (born 1976), Canadian professional wrestler
 Juggernaut (character), a Marvel comics character
 Juggernaut (novel), a 1985 novel by Desmond Bagley

Music 
 Juggernaut (band), an American technical/progressive thrash metal band
 Juggernaut (Hunters & Collectors album), 1997
 Juggernaut (Frank Marino album), 1982
 Juggernaut (Sun City Girls album), 1994
 Juggernaut: Alpha and Juggernaut: Omega, a double album by Periphery
 Juggernaut, an album (and band led) by Frankie Capp & Nat Pierce
 Juggernaut, an album by Knights of the Abyss
 Juggernaut, an album by Lustmord
 "Juggernaut", a song by Cave In from Until Your Heart Stops
 "Juggernaut", a song by Clutch from Pitchfork & Lost Needles
 "Juggernauts" (song), a song by Enter Shikari from Common Dreads
 "Juggernaut", a song by Five Iron Frenzy from Five Iron Frenzy 2: Electric Boogaloo
 "Juggernaut", a song by Gothminister from Anima Inferna
 "Juggernaut", a song by Raven from Life's a Bitch
 "Juggernaut", a single by Sadie (band)
 "Juggernaut", a song by Swollen Members from Beautiful Death Machine
 "JUGGERNAUT", a song by Tyler, the Creator from Call Me If You Get Lost

Film
The Juggernaut, a silent train disaster drama
Juggernaut (1936 film), a film starring Boris Karloff
Juggernaut (1974 film), a suspense film about a bomb threat on the fictional liner SS Britannic
Juggernaut (2003 film), a Dutch documentary film directed by Rob Das
The Juggernaut, character in Thirteen Ghosts
A5 Juggernaut, a fictional vehicle, see list of Star Wars air, aquatic, and ground vehicles

Television 
 "Juggernaut" (Star Trek: Voyager), an episode of Star Trek: Voyager
 The Juggernauts, a Doctor Who audio adventure by Scott Alan Woodard
 Juggernaut, fictional computer program in Digimon Tamers

Games
Juggernaut (video game), a 1999 Playstation game
Juggernaut, a game mode in video games, see glossary of video game terms
The Juggernaut, a unit in Blood & Magic
Juggernaut, a vehicle in Expanded MultiPlayer
Juggernaut, an armored soldier in Call of Duty: Modern Warfare 3
Juggernaut, a ship type in Freespace 2, a 1999 space combat simulation game for the PC
Juggernaut, a unit type in the Command & Conquer series, including Command & Conquer 3: Kane's Wrath

Other uses
New York/New Jersey Juggernaut, a former team in the National Pro Fastpitch softball league
Juggernaut, a British word for a large articulated lorry

See also 
 The Simpsons: Bart vs. The Juggernauts, a 1992 Simpsons-based Game Boy video game
 Jagannath (disambiguation)
 Jagannath Temple (disambiguation)